The Wanamaker Mile is an indoor mile race held annually at the Millrose Games in New York City. It was named in honour of department store owner Rodman Wanamaker. The event was first held in 1926 inside Madison Square Garden, which was the venue for the race until 2012 when it was moved to the Armory in Upper Manhattan.
 
The race was held every year at 10:00 p.m., a tradition started by the legendary sports announcer Ted Husing. Husing would broadcast the race live during the nightly news. In 2002, the mile was moved to 9 p.m. to accommodate television coverage. 

Its start time had been moved to late afternoon by 2018 when it was nationally televised live on NBC.

The race is a tradition for Irish runners: past Irish winners include Ronnie Delany (1956–1959), Eamonn Coghlan (1977, '79–'81, '83, '85 and '87), Marcus O'Sullivan (1986, '88–'90 and 1992), Niall Bruton (1994 and 1996), and Mark Carroll (2000).

It was at the Millrose Games that Coghlan earned the nickname, "Chairman of the Boards" (from the surface of the track being made of wooden boards). O'Sullivan has run 11 sub-four-minute miles in the Wanamaker.

In 2010, Bernard Lagat surpassed Eamonn Coghlan's record of seven Wanamaker Mile victories with his eighth victory.

See also
 Mile run world record progression
 Four-minute mile
 Dicksonpokalen
 Dream Mile
 Emsley Carr Mile

References

External links
Wanamaker Mile Champions List

Mile races
Track and field competitions in the United States
Men's athletics competitions
Track and field in New York City
Wanamaker family